Troy Public High School, also known as Troy Area Senior High School and Troy High School, is a historic high school building located at Troy, Bradford County, Pennsylvania. It is a 2 1/2-story, roughly "E"-shaped Colonial Revival-style building, measuring 435 feet wide and 165 feet deep. It has red brick exterior walls and the front facade features a central pilastered block of nine bays, with 10 Doric order pilasters.  The building is topped by an octagonal cupola.  The original building was built in 1923–1924, and enlarged incrementally with wings on each end in 1936 and 1939, and in 1954, with an enlarged gymnasium / library and new auditorium.

It was added to the National Register of Historic Places in 2002.

Notable alumni
Roger A. Madigan (1930-2018), Pennsylvania state senator and representative

References

School buildings on the National Register of Historic Places in Pennsylvania
Colonial Revival architecture in Pennsylvania
School buildings completed in 1954
Buildings and structures in Bradford County, Pennsylvania
National Register of Historic Places in Bradford County, Pennsylvania
1924 establishments in Pennsylvania